He Fell in Love with His Wife is a 1916 American drama silent film directed by William Desmond Taylor and written by Julia Crawford Ivers and E.P. Roe. The film stars Florence Rockwell, Forrest Stanley, Page Peters, Lydia Yeamans Titus and Howard Davies. The film was released on February 17, 1916, by Paramount Pictures.

Cast 
Florence Rockwell as Alida Armstrong
Forrest Stanley as James Holcroft
Page Peters as Wilson Ostrom
Lydia Yeamans Titus as Bridget Malony
Howard Davies as Tom Watterly

Preservation status
A print is preserved at UCLA Film and Television Archive.

References

External links 
 

1916 films
1910s English-language films
Silent American drama films
1916 drama films
Paramount Pictures films
Films directed by William Desmond Taylor
American black-and-white films
American silent feature films
1910s American films